The Clive River is a river in Hawke's Bay, New Zealand.
The Clive River occupies the former course of the Ngaruroro River, which in 1867 changed flow to its present course during major flooding.

Getting most of its drainage from irrigation ditches around the Heretaunga Plains, the river starts from the west of Flaxmere (just south of the Ngaruroro River), where it flows south-east, west of Hastings before making a sharp, right angle turn towards Havelock North. The river then flows north-east past Havelock North, where it is known as the Karamu Stream, and again flowing past Hastings, this time to the east of Hastings. The river finally turns in an east direction there it flows past the town of Clive and into the Pacific Ocean.

Names

The bed of the river is a remnant of the original course of the Ngaruroro River before flood control diversion works were completed in 1969. It was officially named after Clive of India in 1975. 

It has been proposed that the name be restored to the full original name Ngaruroro Moko-tū-ā-raro-ki-Rangatira, which was decreed by Ruawharo, a tohunga of te waka Tākitimu.

See also
List of rivers of New Zealand

References

Rivers of the Hawke's Bay Region
Rivers of New Zealand